The Times-Sentinel is a weekly newspaper that covers four Sedgwick County, Kansas cities: Cheney, Clearwater, Garden Plain and Goddard. It has a circulation of about 2,300.

References

External links
 The Times-Sentinel official website

Newspapers published in Kansas
Sedgwick County, Kansas